Duplipetala is a genus of flowering plants belonging to the family Gentianaceae.

Its native range is Thailand to Peninsula Malaysia.

Species:

Duplipetala hexagona 
Duplipetala pentanthera

References

Gentianaceae
Gentianaceae genera